The Zagreb Jewish Film Festival (JFF) is an annual film festival held in Zagreb, Croatia which is dedicated to preservation of memories on Holocaust and on raising public awareness about the importance of tolerance.

JFF was originated for the first time in 2007 under license and in collaboration with UK Jewish Film Festival. Festival is organized by the NGO also called Jewish Film Festival headed by Academy-Award-winner Branko Lustig. The festival takes place at the Zagreb Cinema Europa, one of the most beautiful and oldest art-cinemas in the area.

Festival sections

Film program
Zagreb Jewish Film Festival's film programme, which includes feature films, documentaries and short films, is held at Cinema Europa.

Educational mornings
Since 2009 the festival has organised educational mornings about The Holocaust for students of different age groups.

Notable guests
Stjepan Mesić
Simeon Saxe-Coburg-Gotha
Stellan Skarsgård
Nenad Puhovski
Damir Urban
Milan Bandić
Mirko Ilić
James Foley
Severina Vučković
Nikolina Pišek

Support
The Jewish Film Festival Zagreb is funded by the Austrian Cultural Forum and the city of Zagreb as the main sponsor. Among others, the sponsors of the festival in previous years were also Jutarnji list, Školska knjiga, Sheraton Hotels and Resorts, Atlantic Grupa, Mirko Ilić, McCann Erickson, Austrian Cultural Forum, Diners Club International, Erste Group, UNHCR, Jadran Film...

See also
Branko Lustig
History of the Jews in Croatia

References

External links
 

Jewish film festivals in Europe
Film festivals in Croatia
Festivals in Zagreb
Film festivals established in 2007
2007 establishments in Croatia
Jews and Judaism in Croatia
Annual events in Croatia
Events in Zagreb